Leloupia is a monotypic genus of chitons belonging to the family Callochitonidae. The only species is Leloupia belgicae.

References

Chitons
Chiton genera
Monotypic mollusc genera